Dominique McLean, known professionally as SonicFox, is an American professional esports player of several fighting games. McLean is recognized for their versatility and ability to pick up a new game or character and master it for professional play relatively quickly. McLean has topped many tournaments, including six Evolution Championship Series (EVO) events for five different game franchises. They are the highest paid fighting game esports player in the world as of August 4, 2019, with over $600,000 in earnings. McLean was named Esports Player of the Year at The Game Awards 2018 and included in Forbes 2020 "30 Under 30" for Games.

McLean is openly gay and non-binary as well as a furry. They are known to often participate in fighting game tournaments in the fursuit of their fursona, a blue-and-white anthropomorphic fox.

Career 
McLean's older brother, Christian, got McLean interested in fighting video games when McLean was three years old. Over the next several years, while McLean continued to play games, they came into the furry fandom around the age of ten or eleven, and developed the "SonicFox" character.

Around 2011, McLean was playing in non-competitive online Mortal Kombat games, and their online friends encouraged them to try their skills at an offline Mortal Kombat tournament in 2012. While McLean only came in ninth at the event, they were enthralled with the competitive atmosphere, and they have continued to participate in various fighting game championships.

McLean achieved a 6–0 victory at the Injustice: Gods Among Us tournament at Evo 2014. News.com.au reported in December 2015 that McLean had not lost a single tournament in the previous 18 months, and that they earned $150,000 USD within the span of two weeks by winning Mortal Kombat tournaments.

McLean was named the "Esports Player of the Year" at The Game Awards 2018 ceremony, earning media attention for their acceptance speech. Forbes included McLean on their 2020 "30 Under 30" in the Games category.

In 2020, SonicFox was added as a background character in Skullgirls.

Personal life 
McLean was raised in Townsend, Delaware. As of 2018, McLean was a student at the New York Institute of Technology. McLean chose to focus on academics while still maintaining a balance between their professional gaming and school life. In September 2019, McLean came out on Twitter as non-binary. McLean publicly uses singular they pronouns, reserving use of masculine pronouns only for those who they are close to, in order to help normalize the use of singular they.

Notes

References

External links 
 

American esports players
Fighting game players
Furry fandom people
LGBT African Americans
LGBT people from Delaware
Living people
Gay sportsmen
American LGBT sportspeople
LGBT esports players
Mortal Kombat players
Non-binary sportspeople
Evil Geniuses players
Echo Fox players
African-American sportspeople
People from New Castle County, Delaware
Sportspeople from Delaware
Year of birth missing (living people)
21st-century African-American people
The Game Awards winners